The 1973 Arkansas State Indians football team represented Arkansas State University as a member of the Southland Conference during the 1973 NCAA Division II football season. Led by third-year head coach Bill Davidson, the Indians compiled an overall record of 7–3 with a mark of 3–2 in conference play, tying for second place in the Southland.

Schedule

References

Arkansas State
Arkansas State Red Wolves football seasons
Arkansas State Indians football